54 Below is a cabaret and restaurant in the basement of Studio 54 in Midtown Manhattan, New York City. Owned by Broadway producers Steve Baruch, Richard Frankel, Marc Routh and Tom Viertel, 54 Below has hosted shows by such performers as Patti LuPone, Ben Vereen, Sierra Boggess, Lea Salonga, Marilyn Maye, Luann de Lesseps and Barbara Cook.

History 
54 Below opened on June 3, 2012, as 54 Below. Its designers include architect Richard H. Lewis, set designer John Lee Beatty, lighting designer Ken Billington, and sound designer Peter Hylenski. Scott Wittman also serves as Creative Consultant. Jennifer Ashley Tepper serves as the Director of Programming at 54 Below.

54 Below features a variety of musical artists and styles, including musical theatre, opera, and jazz, the last of which was featured in a series co-produced with WBGO.

In September 2015, 54 Below announced a creative alliance with performer and singer, pianist, and music revivalist Michael Feinstein, becoming Feinstein's/54 Below. This partnership ended in July 2022, and the club reverted to the name 54 Below.

At the 75th Tony Awards 54 Below was the recipient of a 2022 Tony Awards Honor for Excellence in the Theatre.

Awards
 2013 BroadwayWorld New York Cabaret Award
Patti LuPone: Show of the Year (Coulda, Woulda, Shoulda)
 Sondheim Unplugged: Best Variety Show/Recurring Series
Terri White: Best One-Show Special Event (Blues to Broadway)
 Alex Rybeck: Best Musical Director for Sibling Revelry with the Callaway Sisters
Jackie Hoffman: Best Musical Comedy Performance (Old Woman, New Material)
Laura Benanti: Best Female Celebrity Vocalist (In Constant Search of the Right Kind of Attention)
 Susie Mosher: Best Host/Producer for Variety Show or Open Mic (Backstage)
 Ann Hampton Callaway & Liz Callaway: Best Duo or Group Show (Sibling Revelry)
 Ahrens & Flaherty: Best Revue (Nice Fighting You: A 30th Anniversary Celebration)
Jason Robert Brown: Best Original Song for a Cabaret Show ("Twenty-Six Names")
Jane Monheit: Best Jazz Vocalist
2013 Bistro Awards
Justin Vivian Bond
Jenifer Lewis
Maurice Hines
 2013 June Briggs Award: Excellence in Destination Management Services
 2013 Concierge Choice Award: Nightlife
 MAC Awards: Board of Directors Award (2013)
 2013 Nightlife Award

Selected performers 
Among the performers who have performed at 54 Below:

Popular culture
54 Below was used in the setting of the Downton Abbey parody Downton Abbey the Musical.

It was also featured in the third season of the webseries Submissions Only.

Recordings
A partnership with Broadway Records has produced live albums of selected shows performed at 54 Below.

References

External links

Cabaret
Restaurants in Manhattan
Music venues in Manhattan
Midtown Manhattan
Studio 54